Tevfik Başer (born 12 January 1951) is a Turkish-German film director and screenwriter. His film Lebewohl, Fremde was screened in the Un Certain Regard section at the 1991 Cannes Film Festival.

Filmography
 Zwischen Gott und Erde (1983)
 40 Quadratmeter Deutschland (1986)
 Abschied vom falschen Paradies (1989)
 Lebewohl, Fremde (1991)

References

External links

1951 births
Living people
People from Çankırı
Turkish emigrants to Germany
Turkish film directors
German film directors
German male screenwriters
Turkish male screenwriters